Bitsquid is a discontinued 3D game engine with support for Linux, Windows, PlayStation 4, PlayStation 3, Xbox 360, Android and iOS. It uses the Lua scripting language.

The company was founded in Stockholm, Sweden, by two engineers who had previously worked at game studio Grin, and by the owners of game developer Fatshark. Fatshark have used the engine in a number of their games.

Games built with the engine include Escape Dead Island, Hamilton's Great Adventure, Krater, Gauntlet, Helldivers, Magicka: Wizard Wars, Magicka 2, The Showdown Effect, War of the Vikings, War of the Roses, Warhammer: End Times - Vermintide  and Warhammer: Vermintide 2.

Bitsquid was acquired by Autodesk in June 2014; the company integrated the engine and related middleware into their games development toolchain, including  3ds Max, Maya, Mudbox, and Maya LT. They also rebranded the engine Autodesk Stingray, hoping to compete with other low-cost-to-enter game engines like Unreal Engine, Unity, and CryEngine. Autodesk offered Stingray on a monthly subscription basis, and an educational and commercial 3-year subscription basis. 

Autodesk announced Stingray's end of sale and development as a standalone product, effective as of January 7, 2018. The Stingray engine however lives on in the re-branded 3DS Max plugin 3DS Max Interactive released in June 2017.

References

External links 
 Autodesk Stingray homepage
 Bitsquid Blog

Video game engines
Autodesk discontinued products